Mohamed Abdel Fatah nicknamed Zaghbir (born 1949) is a Sudanese footballer who played as a goalkeeper. He competed in the 1972 Summer Olympics.

References

External links
 
 

1949 births
Living people
People from River Nile (state)
Footballers at the 1972 Summer Olympics
Sudanese footballers
Olympic footballers of Sudan
1970 African Cup of Nations players
1972 African Cup of Nations players
Africa Cup of Nations-winning players
Association football goalkeepers
Al-Hilal Club (Omdurman) players